Élisabeth d'Ayen Macready (27 October 1898 – 7 December 1969) was a French tennis player who competed in the Olympic games in 1920. She won the bronze medal, along with Suzanne Lenglen, in the women's doubles competition in Antwerp. At the Grand Slam tournaments Macready reached the third round at the Wimbledon Championships (1923) and the French Championships (1925).

References

External links 
 

1898 births
1969 deaths
French female tennis players
Olympic medalists in tennis
Olympic bronze medalists for France
Olympic tennis players of France
Tennis players at the 1920 Summer Olympics
Medalists at the 1920 Summer Olympics
Wives of baronets
20th-century French women